Carex tsaratananensis is a tussock-forming species of perennial sedge in the family Cyperaceae. It is native to parts of central Madagascar.

See also
List of Carex species

References

tsaratananensis
Taxa named by Henri Chermezon
Plants described in 1925
Flora of Madagascar